East Dublin is a city in Laurens County, Georgia, United States. The population was 2,441 at the 2010 census. It is part of the Dublin Micropolitan Statistical Area.

Geography

East Dublin is located in north-central Laurens County at  (32.550854, -82.868661), on the east bank of the Oconee River. It is bordered to the west, across the river, by the city of Dublin, the Laurens county seat.

U.S. Routes 80 and 319 pass through East Dublin as Central Drive. US 80 leads east  to Swainsboro, while US 319 leads northeast  to Wrightsville. The two highways lead west together into Dublin.

Demographics

2020 census

As of the 2020 United States census, there were 2,492 people, 982 households, and 643 families residing in the city.

2000 census
As of the census of 2000, there were 2,484 people, 949 households, and 680 families residing in the city. The racial makeup of the city was 56.12% White, 42.23% African American, 0.16% Native American, 0.24% Asian, 0.64% from other races, and 0.60% from two or more races. Hispanic or Latino of any race were 1.89% of the population.

There were 949 households, out of which 33.7% had children under the age of 18 living with them, 42.3% were married couples living together, 24.7% had a female householder with no husband present, and 28.3% were non-families. 24.2% of all households were made up of individuals, and 11.5% had someone living alone who was 65 years of age or older.  The average household size was 2.62 and the average family size was 3.10.

In the city, the population was spread out, with 29.8% under the age of 18, 9.5% from 18 to 24, 26.4% from 25 to 44, 23.0% from 45 to 64, and 11.3% who were 65 years of age or older.  The median age was 34 years. For every 100 females, there were 83.6 males.  For every 100 females age 18 and over, there were 79.1 males.

The median income for a household in the city was $24,412, and the median income for a family was $28,548. Males had a median income of $25,500 versus $16,756 for females. The per capita income for the city was $10,918.  About 19.4% of families and 22.2% of the population were below the poverty line, including 33.1% of those under age 18 and 17.6% of those age 65 or over.

Education

It is in the Laurens County School District:
 East Laurens Primary School
 East Laurens Elementary School
 East Laurens Middle School
 East Laurens High School

References

External links
Official website

Cities in Georgia (U.S. state)
Cities in Laurens County, Georgia
Dublin, Georgia micropolitan area